Pendleton Together is a tenant management organisation (TMO) in Pendleton, Salford, England, that manages the housing stock of Salford City Council – their council housing stock.

In June 2017, it was reported that nine tower blocks in Pendleton had similar aluminium composite material (ACM) to that in the Grenfell Tower fire.

References

External links 
 

Organisations based in Salford
Tenant management organisations in England
Housing organizations